Rafael Hernández Rojas (born 28 February 1946 in Mexico City) is a Mexican former breaststroke, freestyle and medley swimmer who competed in the 1964 Summer Olympics and 1968 Summer Olympics.

References

1946 births
Living people
Mexican male freestyle swimmers
Swimmers from Mexico City
Mexican male breaststroke swimmers
Mexican male medley swimmers
Olympic swimmers of Mexico
Swimmers at the 1963 Pan American Games
Swimmers at the 1964 Summer Olympics
Swimmers at the 1968 Summer Olympics
Competitors at the 1966 Central American and Caribbean Games
Central American and Caribbean Games gold medalists for Mexico
Central American and Caribbean Games medalists in swimming
Pan American Games competitors for Mexico
20th-century Mexican people
21st-century Mexican people